Haeju is a city located in South Hwanghae Province near Haeju Bay in North Korea. It is the administrative centre of South Hwanghae Province. As of 2008, the population of the city is estimated to be 273,300. At the beginning of the 20th century, it became a strategic port in Sino-Korean trade. Haeju has chemical-related enterprises and a cement factory.

History
The area around Haeju is known to have been inhabited since the Neolithic period, as shellmounds, pottery, and stone tools have been found at Ryongdangp'o. During the early Three kingdoms period, it was briefly governed by a small chieftain, when it was known as "Naemihol". In 757, however, it was conquered by the Goguryeo kingdom, who later lost it to Silla. It was under the Goryeo dynasty's King T'aejo that it received its current name.

Sohyon Academy (소현서원) was a Confucian academy founded near Haeju by the famous Joseonese scholar Yi I (1536–84) after his retirement. It is situated in Unbyong Valley, a part of Soktamgugok (Nine valleys of pools and rocks).

According to the North Korean government, the North Korean attack on South Korea on 25 June 1950 was a response to a two-day long bombing by the South Koreans and their surprise attacks on Haeju and other places. Early in the morning of 25 June, before the dawn counterattack in the North Korean account, the South Korean Office of Public Information announced that the Southern forces had  captured Haeju. The South Korean government later denied capturing the town and blamed the report on an exaggerating officer. Yugoslavia and the Soviet Union proposed that North Korea would be invited to the UN Security Council to present its side of the story. Both proposals were voted down.

Geography
Haeju City is located on the  westernmost edge of the Korean Peninsula, 60 km north of the Military Demarcation Line and 100 km south of Pyongyang. The city, being not very mountainous, is composed mostly of plains. All the mountains located within the city are under 1,000 m in elevation.

Mountains 
Mountain Suyang, 946 m.
Mountain Jangdae, 686 m.
Nam Hill, 122 m.

Climate 
Haeju has a humid continental climate (Köppen climate classification: Dwa), with cold, dry winters and hot, humid summers.

Administrative divisions
Haeju is divided into several urban neighborhoods ("dong") and several rural villages ("ri").

Culture and travel

Famous tourist attractions in the city center include Puyong Pavilion, the Haeju Dharani Monument, the Haeju Sokbinggo, and several trees classified as living monuments. Farther out, scenic spots include Suyangsan Falls, the Sokdamgugok scenic area, Suyangsan Fortress and the Sohyon Academy.

Economy
Haeju Special Economic Zone was announced in the Second Inter-Korean summit meeting between the South Korean president Roh Moo-Hyun and the North Korean supreme leader Kim Jong-Il. It was to be a Special Economic Zone centered on the Haeju port. The zone would have consisted of 16.5 km2 of development, and also the expansion of the Haeju port. This project was estimated to cost over US$4.5 billion.

This economic agreement between South Korea and North Korea would have allowed trading across the Northern Limit Line between the ports of Incheon and Haeju, only 110 km apart. Recent military skirmishes make any revival of this deal unlikely for the time being.

Transportation
Haeju has a military and civilian dual purposes air station (HAE), with a 12/30 runway (Haeju Airport). Haeju also has one of the major economic and military ports in North Korea. It is connected to Sariwŏn via the Hwanghae Ch'ŏngnyŏn Line of the Korean State Railway.

Education
Haeju is home to Haeju University of Education, Haeju College of Art, and Kim Je Won Haeju University of Agriculture.
Sohyon Academy (소현서원) was a Confucian academy founded by the famous scholar Yi Yulgok (1536–84). It is situated in the Unbyong Valley west of Haeju.

Media
The Korean Central Broadcasting Station airs on AM 1080 kHz using a 1.5-megawatt mediumwave transmitter.

Sister cities
 Guaranda, Ecuador
 Ulan-Ude, Russia

People born in Haeju

 Choe Chung (984–1068), Confucian scholar and poet
 Choe Yun-ui (1102–1162), Confucian scholar
 Choe Manri (d. 1445), minister of Hall of Worthies
 Injo of Joseon (1595–1649), the sixteenth king of the Joseon dynasty in Korea
 Syngman Rhee, the first president of South Korea
 Kim Koo (1876–1949), last president of the Provisional Government of the Republic of Korea
 An Jung-geun (1879–1910), independence activist who assassinated Itō Hirobumi
 Mirok Li (1899–1950), writer
 Kang Joon-ho (1928–1990), bronze-medalist Olympic boxer (1952)
 Jong Song-ok (1974), marathon gold-medalist & Olympic runner

Haeju is the home of the Haeju Choi and the Haeju Oh clan.

See also

 List of cities in North Korea

Notes

Citations

Bibliography
 .

Further reading
Dormels, Rainer. North Korea's Cities: Industrial facilities, internal structures and typification. Jimoondang, 2014.

External links 

 
North Korea Uncovered
 Haeju photos. Traveller's blog with pictures from North Korea
 City profile of Haeju 

 
Cities in South Hwanghae
Port cities and towns in North Korea